Mickies Dairy Bar (often shortened to Mickies) is a 1950s style diner located in Madison, Wisconsin.

History 
Opened in 1946 by Mickey Weidman, and located just across the street from Camp Randall Stadium, it has become a popular game day tradition amongst many Badger fans. The diner is well known for its breakfast selections, especially the Scrambler, which is a large mound of potatoes, eggs, cheese, gravy, and a patrons' choice of other toppings.

In media

Mickies been featured on numerous national broadcasts, including ESPN's "Todd's Taste of the Town".

References

Restaurants in Wisconsin
Restaurants established in 1946
1946 establishments in Wisconsin
Buildings and structures in Madison, Wisconsin